A disjunctive population, in ecology, is a colony of plants or animals, whose geographical locus is severed from the continuous range of the bulk of the species distribution. Although a disjunctive population may sometimes occur on an island, which creates physical separation via water, a large percentage of disjunctive populations are separated from their main range simply by landmass. In some cases a disjunctive population represents a relatively small outlier population from the main range, but in other cases, such as for the painted hunting dog, Lycaon pictus, the entire population is scattered (throughout much of Africa) and is intrinsically disjunctive.

See also
 Ecological island
 Disjunct distribution

Notes

References
 A.W.D. Larkum, Robert Joseph Orth and Carlos M. Duarte. 2006. Seagrasses: biology, ecology, and conservation, Published by Springer, 9781402029424  691 pages

Ecology